Derek D'Souza  is a former Indian footballer. D'Souza is known for scoring the first ever goal for the India national football team in the AFC Asian Cup qualifiers in the 1960 qualifiers in which he scored the only goal in India's 1–0 victory over Pakistan.

He also served as head coach of the India national team from period of 1992–93.

Honours

India
Merdeka Tournament runner-up: 1964

See also
 List of India national football team managers

References

Living people
Footballers from Mumbai
Association football forwards
Indian footballers
India international footballers
Indian football managers
India national football team managers
Year of birth missing (living people)